Boblins is an animated educational television show for preschool children produced by the British company InspireGLG Limited. The show, which runs in 10-minute segments, is broadcast internationally, being shown in the United Kingdom on CITV, in Canada by Treehouse TV, in Denmark by DR1, in New Zealand on TVNZ "Kidzone", and in Australia on ABC2. The show was picked up in 2006 for broadcasting in France by TiJi, the French children's network.

The show features seven bright, colorful characters who interact in a colourful land called Rainbow's End. Its purpose is to instruct children about basic facts of colour as well as nature and environment. The non-profit organization Young Media Australia indicates the show is most appropriate for children aged two to seven, combining unrealistic slapstick comedy with general and social education encouraging such traits as cooperation and persistence.

Characters
Yam Yam- a friendly, cheerful, fun-loving yellow Boblin who loves bouncing up and down and can't resist pushing buttons when he's told not to which leads to trouble.
Gully- a hard-working, gossiping green female Boblin who takes care of the animals in the farm.
Ruddle- a red Boblin who is kept busy by building and fixing things and helps Pi build his inventions.
Onny- an orange Boblin who is a motherly-type figure to the other Boblins, her hobbies are baking cakes.
Pi- (named after the number pi) the most clever of the Boblins and is always building inventions (which can sometimes malfunction and cause trouble). Pi is purple, wears a pair of glasses and loves eating cupcakes.
Pinny-  a pink Boblin and the youngest of the group. She is cheerful, and her favorite hobby is painting.
Bodkin- a blue, friendly and adventurous Boblin who is seen hiking, climbing up mountains, swinging on vines ectc.

References

External links
Official site
InspireGLG Limited

2008 British television series debuts
2000s British animated television series
2000s British children's television series
British children's animated comedy television series
ITV children's television shows
Treehouse TV original programming
Australian Broadcasting Corporation original programming
British computer-animated television series
British preschool education television series
Animated preschool education television series
2000s preschool education television series
English-language television shows